Beach kabaddi competition at the 2016 Asian Beach Games was held in Danang, Vietnam from 23 to 27 September 2016 at Bien Dong Park, Danang, Vietnam.

Medalists

Medal table

Results

Men

Preliminary

Group A

Group B

Knockout round

Semifinals

Gold medal match

Women

Preliminary

Group A

Group B

Knockout round

Semifinals

Gold medal match

References 

Results and Schedules

External links 
 

2016
2016 Asian Beach Games events
Asian